Aetiopedes is a monotypic genus of amphipods belonging to the monotypic family Aetiopedesidae. The only species is Aetiopedes gracilis.

The species is found in Australia.

References

Amphipoda
Monotypic crustacean genera